The RSL chicken is a crossbred variety of chicken, derived from the chicken breeds Ri, Sasso, and Luong Phuong. The genotype composition is: 50% Ri, 25% Sasso, and 25% Luong Phuong.

Fertility 

RSL started laying eggs at 153 days of age; egg production to 52 weeks of age was 110.75 fruits / roof; FCR for 10 eggs was 2.31 kg / head
Proportion of embryonated eggs, hatching rate and the rate of type 1 corresponding chicks were: 92.34%, 82.88%, 78.88%.
Consumption and production costs chicks feed type 1 is: 0.472 kg/head and 5.136 VND/child.

Ability to grow and for meat 
RSL chicken (50% Ri, 25% Sasso, 25% Luong Phuong ) commercial grow with increased survival from 94-95%. At the age of 15 weeks - 16 - 17, body weight is 1.621,98 RSL chickens - 1695.28 to 1748.18 g / head; chicken carcass ratio is 60,48 RSL - from 68.49 to 69.21%. Consumption and the cost of food for a kg increase in weight was 3.10 kilograms of meat and 32 119 RSL/kg.
Chicken (75% Ri, Sasso 12.5%, 12.5% Luong Phuong) slaughtered at 15 weeks of age for the highest efficiency.

References

Chicken crossbreeds